Antonio da Noli was one of a dozen s built for the  (Royal Italian Navy) in the late 1920s. Completed in 1931, she served in World War II.

Design and description
Their complement during wartime was 222–225 officers and enlisted men.

The Navigatoris were powered by two Parsons geared steam turbines, each driving one propeller shaft using steam supplied by four Odero-Terni-Orlando water-tube boilers.

Their main battery consisted of six  guns in three twin-gun turrets, one each fore and aft of the superstructure and the third amidships. Anti-aircraft (AA) defense for the Navigatori-class ships was provided by a pair of  AA guns in single mounts abreast the forward funnel and a pair of twin-gun mounts for  machine guns. They were equipped with six  torpedo tubes in two triple mounts amidships. The Navigatoris could carry 86–104 mines.

Construction and career
Antonio da Noli was laid down by Cantieri del Tirreno at their Riva Trigoso shipyard on 25 July 1927, launched on 21 May 1929 and commissioned on 29 December.

Citations

Bibliography

External links
 Antonio da Noli Marina Militare website

Navigatori-class destroyers
1929 ships
World War II destroyers of Italy
Maritime incidents in September 1943
Ships built by Cantieri Navali del Tirreno e Riuniti